The Unity List (Slovene: Enotna lista) or EL seeks to represent the indigenous Slovene minority in Carinthia. It came into existence in 1991, replacing the "Club of Slovenian Local Councillors" (Slovene: ,), which had existed as an initiative of local Slovenian party lists from various local councils. Slovenian party lists have regularly contested elections in Carinthia since 1950. The current chairperson of the EL is Vladimir Smrtnik.

Since the percentage of Slovenians in Carinthia is below the election threshold in the Carinthian Parliament (10%), the EL cannot represent the Carinthian Slovenes in the Carinthian or Austrian Parliament. In 1975 the EL missed a mandate in the Carinthian parliament by a few hundred votes (the vote tally then, of 6130, is the highest the party ever got after World War II). In 1979, however, Carinthia was split up in four electoral districts, making it impossible for the EL to pass the threshold on its own, without making any electoral alliance. Therefore, on both Land and national levels, the EL has tended to participate in electoral unions (sometimes with the Greens, sometimes with the Liberal Forum).

The party is represented on its own on the local level. It has councilors in several local councils in the bilingual region of Carinthia. Currently, 52 local councillors are members of the EL. Since March 2009, the municipality of Eisenkappel-Vellach is run by a mayor of the EL.

The party is full member of the European Free Alliance.

See also
Slovene Union

References

External links
Party website

Political parties in Austria
Political parties of minorities
Carinthian Slovenes
European Free Alliance
1973 establishments in Austria